The third and final season of Happy Endings, an American television series. ABC officially renewed Happy Endings for a third season on May 11, 2012. It was also announced it would move to a new time-slot on Tuesdays at 9:00pm, as a lead-in to Don't Trust the B---- in Apartment 23. The season premiered on October 23, 2012. On February 13, 2013, ABC announced that, starting March 29, 2013, the series would move to Fridays at 8:00-9:00 p.m ET/PT with back-to-back original episodes. The series finale aired on May 3, 2013.

ABC's scheduling of Happy Endings's third season was labeled the "Worst TV Strategy" of the 2012-13 television season.

Cast

Starring
 Eliza Coupe as Jane Kerkovich-Williams
 Elisha Cuthbert as Alex Kerkovich
 Zachary Knighton as Dave Rose
 Adam Pally as Max Blum
 Damon Wayans Jr. as Brad Williams
 Casey Wilson as Penny Hartz

Recurring
 Nick Zano as Pete (8 episodes)
 Stephen Guarino as Derrick (3 episodes)
 Rob Corddry as Lon "The Car Czar" Sarofsky (3 episodes)
 Mark-Paul Gosselaar as Chase (2 episodes)
 Christopher McDonald as Mr. Kerkovich (2 episodes)
 Julie Hagerty as Mrs. Kerkovich (2 episodes)
 Seth Morris as Scotty (2 episodes)
 Tom Kenny as Tyler Kerkovich (1 episode)
 Brian Austin Green as Chris (1 episode)
 Mary Elizabeth Ellis as Daphne Wilson (1 episode)
 Megan Mullally as Dana Hartz (1 episode)
 Michael McKean as 'Big' Dave Rose (1 episode)

Notable guest stars
 Rachael Harris as Suzanne ("Sabado Free-Gante")
 Marc Evan Jackson as the Fishmonger ("More Like Stanksgiving")
 Jon Daly as Brody Daniels ("P&P Romance Factory")
 Kulap Vilaysack as Nicole ("To Serb with Love")
 Matt Walsh as Duckie Blenkinship ("KickBall 2: The Kickening")
 Lance Briggs as himself ("KickBall 2: The Kickening")
 David Alan Grier as Terry Chuckles ("In the Heat of the Noche")
 Abby Elliott as Katie ("The Straight Dope")
 RuPaul as Krisjahn ("The Incident")
 Andy Richter as Roy ("Bros Before Bros")
 Stephanie March as Brooke Kerkovich ("Brothas & Sisters")
 James Lesure as Elliot ("Brothas & Sisters")

Episodes

Production 
ABC officially renewed Happy Endings for a third season on May 11, 2012. It was also announced it would move to a new time-slot on Tuesdays at 9:00pm, as a lead-in to Don't Trust the B---- in Apartment 23. It premiered on October 23, 2012.

The first six episodes of the season aired in Canada on City, two days prior to the American broadcasts airing on ABC. KickBall 2: The Kickening, an episode from season two that previously did not air on ABC, made its debut as part of the third season on ABC and City on January 13, 2013, despite having aired internationally as part of season two.

On December 4, 2012, ABC announced that on Tuesday, March 26, 2013, Dancing with the Stars would re-take the Tuesday 9 PM hour, leaving the fate of unaired episodes unclear. On December 21, 2012, ABC announced that new episodes of both Happy Endings and Don't Trust the B---- in Apartment 23 will replace the cancelled drama 666 Park Avenue for three weeks on January 6, January 13, and January 20 while maintaining its current timeslot. Only 2 of the 3 scheduled episodes aired on the Sunday timeslot.

On January 22, 2013, ABC announced that it has removed Don't Trust the B---- in Apartment 23 from the schedule and would instead air back-to-back Happy Endings concurrently on Tuesdays, but it was removed from the timeslot after episodes 12 and 13 aired. However, on February 13, 2013, ABC announced that, starting March 29, the series would move to Fridays at 8:00-9:00 p.m ET/PT with back-to-back original episodes.

On April 19, 2013, ABC preempted its primetime programming in favor of covering the Boston manhunt, after the Boston Marathon bombing, pushing back the season finale date to May 3, 2013.

Reception

Critical reception
The third season of Happy Endings continued the series' critical acclaim. In regards to the premiere, David Sims of The A.V. Club stated "In a TV landscape increasingly dotted with low-concept ensemble comedies that are trying to be all whip-smart and funny, it’s nice to have "Happy Endings" back to put ’em all in their place." Verne Gay of Newsday said that "Happy Endings", cast and all, has now officially jelled. The show exists on the same cosmic (and comic) TV plane as "Scrubs," "Arrested Development" and that other late bloomer, "Cougar Town." Maureen Ryan of The Huffington Post stated that "Happy Endings" has so many things going for it that the occasional weak story line or meh scene is not a big deal at all. It's one of the sharpest and warm-hearted comedies on the air, and I enjoy it a lot more than "Modern Family..." Clay Sublett of Splitsider said, "If ABC is willing to give them a chance, Happy Endings can come back in season four and fill the hole 30 Rock will leave in our hearts."

At the end of the third season, with the show facing possible cancellation due to low ratings, Rolling Stone declared that the show was "the most underrated, under-watched series on TV, that may also be the funniest" and went on to say, "Despite flying under the radar, Happy Endings has stayed afloat for three seasons by earning both critical acclaim and a devote fan following. Blending comedic elements of Friends, Arrested Development, and 30 Rock, it manages to serve up something new and refreshing by being both consumed by and annoyed with the frenetic world we live in. It's biting, but easy to swallow – social commentary at its best."

U.S. Ratings

Home media
Unlike the first two seasons of the show, the third season was released exclusively through Amazon's manufacture-on-demand program – where the content is custom burned onto DVD-R discs to fulfill orders sold directly to the consumer – rather than using the traditional business model of pressing batches of discs that ship to "brick and mortar" retailers. As is standard with MOD releases, the release contains no special features.

References 

2012 American television seasons
2013 American television seasons